Jacobo Grinberg-Zylberbaum (born Mexico City, 1946), known as Jacobo Grinberg (Obo) was a Mexican pseudoscientist, neurophysiologist and psychologist. He studied Mexican shamanism, Eastern disciplines, meditation, astrology and telepathy, using his own interpretation of a scientific method. He wrote more than 50 books about these subjects. Grinberg disappeared in December 1994.

Biography  
Jacobo Grinberg-Zylberbaum was born in Mexico City in 1946. Grinberg decided to study the human mind when he was 12 years old, after his mother died from a brain tumor. He studied psychology at the Faculty of Psychology of UNAM.
In 1970, he went to New York City to study psychophysiology at the Brain Research Institute. He earned a Ph.D. at the E. Roy John Laboratory. His Ph.D. focused on the electrophysiological effects of geometric stimuli on the human brain.

When he went back to Mexico, he founded a laboratory of psychophysiology at the Universidad Anáhuac. He installed another laboratory of this kind in UNAM in the late 1970s. He founded the Instituto Nacional para el Estudio de la Conciencia (INPEC) in 1987, financed by UNAM and CONACYT. Jacobo published several of his books through INPEC. Grinberg wrote more than 50 books about brain activity, witchcraft, shamanism, telepathy, and meditation.

Grinberg put his reputation as a scientist in danger when he tried to use the scientific method in shamanism studies. He combined the two in his professional work, always trying to understand the “magic world.” Grinberg attempted to change the way that the relationship between science and consciousness is understood. His work was rejected by fellow scientists as "psi assumption", the premise that any deviation from chance represents a case of telepathy.

Disappearance 
Since December 8, 1994, Jacobo Grinberg has been missing. On December 12, his family prepared a party for him to celebrate his 48th birthday, but he did not show up. It was common for him to make spontaneous travels or just not answer his phone for days, which is why his disappearance did not seem odd to his family in the beginning. There are many conspiracy theories surrounding Grinberg's disappearance.

The Sintergy Theory 
Grinberg's sintergy theory states that there is a continuous space of energy and the common human can only perceive a part of it. The result of this process is what everyone understands as "reality." This theory tries to answer the question of the creation of the experience. The book where it is mentioned, El Cerebro Consciente, was translated into seven languages.

See also
List of people who disappeared
List of people from Morelos, Mexico
TV Series exploring a fictional account of Jacobo's disappearance

References

1946 births
1990s missing person cases
Mexican male writers
Mexican psychologists
Mexican scientists
Missing people
Missing person cases in Mexico
People from Mexico City